Digital Forty Four was a Sydney-only trial datacasting service that was licensed by the Australian Broadcasting Authority (now the Australian Communications and Media Authority) beginning on 17 March 2004 for an initial three-year run until late 2007. The license was extended on several occasions past 2007, however on 29 January 2010 it was announced that Broadcast Australia's datacasting licence for Digital Forty Four would not be extended past 30 April 2010. At midnight on 30 April 2010, all services from Digital Forty Four ceased broadcasting.

The services provided at various times during its six years of operation have included a television guide for free-to-air television, a community service channel providing information on road, weather and surf conditions, with live broadcasts every fifteen minutes, the Australian Christian Channel, Expo shopping channel, NITV, Teachers TV information channel and live broadcasts of the meetings of the Australian Parliament, with audio-video coverage of the House of Representatives and Senate.

Channels
Under conditions associated with the datacasting licence, channels on the Digital Forty Four service had to be either text based or narrowcast services. Entertainment programming was not allowed on the service, however some programming on the Australian Christian Channel was shown in a reduced screen format with text content around it, as that satisfied the datacast requirement.

Former Channels
As it was a long term trial, many channels that started on the service did not continue until the cessation of broadcasts.

Legacy

The ACMA decided in closing the service that it was unlikely that datacast services would come to auction in the near future, and decided continuing the trial was unnecessary for that reason. NITV, which gained coverage on the service, considered the closure of the service a blow to its chances of gaining permanent spectrum for the service, and put the long term viability of the service into question.

Most of the other channels on Digital Forty Four are available unencrypted on satellite or via online streaming.

See also
 Datacasting
 Television broadcasting in Australia

References

Television stations in Sydney
Digital terrestrial television in Australia
Defunct television channels in Australia
English-language television stations in Australia
Television channels and stations established in 2004
Television channels and stations disestablished in 2010
2004 establishments in Australia
2010 disestablishments in Australia